Two Birds may refer to:

"Two Birds" (Awake), the 12th episode of the American TV drama Awake
Two Birds (film), a 2008 Icelandic film
Two Birds with the Wings of One, 2006 ballet by Jean-Pierre Bonnefoux
At Swim-Two-Birds, a 1939 novel by Brian O'Nolan
One Stone and Two Birds, a 2005 Taiwanese film
Two Birds (album), a 2017 album by Trixie Mattel
"Two Birds", a song from the 2009 album Far by Regina Spektor.

See also
Bird & Bird, an international law firm headquartered in London